M60, M-60, or M.60 most often refers to:
 M60 machine gun, an American machine gun
 M60 tank, an American main battle tank

M60, M-60, or M.60 may also refer to:

Firearms and military equipment
 M60 105mm Cartridge, a U.S. chemical artillery shell
 M60 assault rifle, a Yugoslav AK-47 clone
 M60 recoilless gun, am 82-mm antitank recoilless gun developed in Yugoslavia
 M60 AVLB, an American bridgelaying tank
 Halcon M60, an Argentine 9mm/.45 ACP submachine gun
 Saber Radar, M60 air defense radar unit developed by the Brazilian Army

Transportation
 M-60 (Michigan highway), a state highway in southern Michigan
 M.60 Marathon, an aircraft
 M60 highway (Russia), a highway in the Russian Far East
 M60 motorway (Hungary), a motorway in Hungary
 M60 motorway (Great Britain), a motorway in Greater Manchester, England
 M60 (New York City bus), a New York City Bus route in Manhattan and Queens
 BMW M60, a 1992 automobile engine

Other uses
 M60, a 1984 Olivetti Zilog Z8001 based computer
 Messier 60, an elliptical galaxy in the Virgo Cluster
 M 60, an age group for Masters athletics (athletes aged 35+)